Hajjiabad (also Romanized as Ḩājjīābād; also known as Ḩājīmaḩalleh) is a village in Mir Shams ol Din Rural District, in the Central District of Tonekabon County, Mazandaran Province, Iran. At the 2006 census, its population was 1,810, in 508 families.

References 

Populated places in Tonekabon County